Juan David Díaz Navarro (born 27 August 1987) is a Colombian footballer.

References

External links 
Juan David Díaz at playmakerstats.com (English version of ceroacero.es)

1987 births
Living people
Colombian footballers
Colombia under-20 international footballers
Colombia international footballers
Bogotá FC footballers
Cortuluá footballers
C.D. Juventud Independiente players
Colombian expatriate footballers
Expatriate footballers in El Salvador
Association football defenders